The InterPortPolice (also INTERPORTPOLICE) is the international organization of law enforcement agencies established to combat serious transnational crimes, such as terrorism and drug smuggling an various transportation hubs, such as seaports and airports, and involving airport, seaport, transport and border police forces.

The organization was established in 1969, initially under the name  International Organization of Port Authority Police. In 1974 airport authorities were included into the organization, and its name was changed accordingly to the International Association of Airport and Seaport Police (IAASP). In 2010 its charter was expanded again, to include transport and border authorities. This time, rather than expand the name, it was decided to use the acronym INTERPORTPOLICE to represent the international association of airport, seaport, and transport law enforcement.

History 
The InterPortPolice is an international organization of law enforcement, which focuses on critical infrastructure for airport and seaport authorities. Development of the organisation began in 1968 by police departments from Canada, Netherlands, United Kingdom, and the United States to address transnational crime. The organization's original name was International Organization of Port Authority Police. The first meeting was held in 1970 at the Mass Port Authority. Four years later the group added airport authorities and changed their name to  International Association of Airport and Seaport Police (IAASP). In 2010, the focus was broadened by including a holistic approach of all authorities within the security boundary to include border and large event requirements.  At that time the name InterPortPolice was adopted to stand for International Organization of Airport and Seaport Police. Today they represent airport, seaport, border, and transport police and security requirements.

Fred V. Morrone 
The executive vice president of the organization, Fred V. Morrone, died in the September 11 attacks.

Not only was Morrone the vice president of the InterPortPolice, but also Superintendent of police and Director of Public Safety at the Port Authority in New York and New Jersey. He was raised in New York and New Jersey. He went to Richard Stockton College, where he received a bachelor's degree in political science. He received his master's degree in public administration from Rider University. Morrone had many jobs in law enforcement, including state trooper.

Morrone was 63 when he led Port Authority police officers into the towers. He and 36 other officers died when the tower collapsed. Morrone was a husband and a father of three children. 

A year after the attacks at the 9/11 memorial for the fallen officers, InterPortPolice and Morrone's family created the Morrone Education Program, set up to educate officers and help aid in the fight against terrorism.

References

International law enforcement organizations
Organizations established in 1969
Organizations based in New York City